The Democratic Party (Danish: Det Demokratiske Parti, less officially Demokraterne) is a political party in Denmark. The party was founded in September 2012 by former conservative member of parliament and former chairman of the Christian Democrats, Per Ørum Jørgensen, a few weeks after his resignation as chairman. The new party has no religious profile, but is a socially conservative, centre-right party which focuses on social issues and on reducing the distance between the citizens and the government in several respects. It wants Denmark to leave the EU. Instead, it wants a union of the Nordic countries of the same type. The party has no parliamentary representation.

References

Eurosceptic parties in Denmark
Defunct political parties in Denmark
Conservative parties in Denmark
Political parties established in 2012
2012 establishments in Denmark
2015 disestablishments in Denmark
Political parties disestablished in 2015